Hypophysis  may refer to:

Pituitary gland
Hypophysis (plant embryogenesis)